Skövde Handbollsflickor is a Swedish women's handball club from Skövde playing in the Elitserien. Playing in top-flight since 1997, Skövde won its first championship in 2008. In all other seasons since 2005 it has been the championship's runner-up. As such Skövde has been a regular of the EHF Cup since 2007, though it has yet to get past the qualifying stages.

Kits

Sports Hall information

Name: – Arena Skövde
City: – Skövde
Capacity: – 2500
Address: – Egnells väg 1, 541 41 Skövde

Titles
 Elitserien
 2008

References

External links
  
 

Swedish handball clubs
Sport in Skövde
Handball clubs established in 1949
1949 establishments in Sweden